Ron Corry (born 21 July 1941) is an Australian former football (soccer) player and coach. He played as a goalkeeper for Australia before entering a coaching career. He is the Goalkeeping coach of Western Sydney Wanderers.

Playing career

Club career
Corry, known to many as 'Yoda', began his playing career with Canterbury as a junior, graduating to the senior team in 1964. He moved to Pan Hellenic in 1965 before transferring to Croatia in 1966. After 10 seasons at Croatia he moved to Manly in 1976. He switched to Sutherland for the start of 1977 season before a mid-season return to Manly. In 1980, he joined Marconi in the National Soccer League. After the 1981 NSL season he retired from football.

International career
Corry played 33 full international matches for Australia between 1967 and 1973.

Coaching career
In 1989 Corry became manager of Sydney Croatia. In 2000, Corry was appointed as manager of the current NSL champions the Wollongong Wolves. Corry led the side to another championship in his first season with the club.

He was appointed goalkeeping coach of Western Sydney Wanderers in 2012.

Honours

Coaching

Club 
 Wollongong Wolves
 National Soccer League Championship: 2000–01

 Western Sydney Wanderers
 AFC Champions League Champions: 2014

References

1941 births
Sydney United 58 FC players
Sydney Olympic FC players
Marconi Stallions FC players
Sutherland Sharks FC players
National Soccer League (Australia) players
National Soccer League (Australia) coaches
Sydney United 58 FC managers
Living people
Association football goalkeepers
Australian soccer players
Australia international soccer players
Association football goalkeeping coaches